Bob Hewitt and Frew McMillan were the defending champions, but Hewitt did not participate this year.  McMillan partnered Bob Carmichael, losing in the semifinals.

Wojtek Fibak and Tom Okker won the title, defeating Peter Fleming and John McEnroe 5–7, 6–1, 6–3 in the final.

Seeds

Draw

Finals

Top half

Bottom half

References
Draw

U.S. Pro Indoor
1979 Grand Prix (tennis)